Pieczonka may refer to:

People
 Adrianne Pieczonka, Canadian operatic soprano
 Albert Pieczonka, composer, pianist and music instructor

Places
 Pieczonka, Podlaskie Voivodeship
 Pieczonka, West Pomeranian Voivodeship